Peace process may refer to overall peace processes, or to:

Phases of peace processes
Peacemaking - non-military processes of stopping an intrastate or interstate armed conflict
Peace enforcement - military processes of stopping an intrastate or interstate armed conflict
Peacekeeping - the presence of neutral military forces to prevent armed conflict from restarting
Peacebuilding - processes of sociological transformation for long-term prevention of recurrence of armed conflict

Specific peace processes

 
 
 
 
 List of peace processes

See also
 Peace treaty
 Process (disambiguation)
 Peace (disambiguation)